Francis Reilly (26 May 1894 – 1956) was a Scottish professional footballer who played as a centre half in the Football League for Blackburn Rovers and in the Scottish League for Falkirk.

Personal life 
Reilly served as a private in McCrae's Battalion of the Royal Scots during the First World War. He was wounded during the course of his service.

Career statistics

References 

Scottish footballers
Royal Scots soldiers
Scottish Football League players
McCrae's Battalion
British Army personnel of World War I
Place of death missing
Falkirk F.C. players
Association football wing halves
Blackburn Rovers F.C. players
Llanelli Town A.F.C. players
Swansea City A.F.C. players
Weymouth F.C. players
Lancaster City F.C. players
1894 births
1956 deaths
Footballers from Perth, Scotland
English Football League players